Brenda Marjorie Hale, Baroness Hale of Richmond,  (born 31 January 1945) is a British judge who served as President of the Supreme Court of the United Kingdom from 2017 until her retirement in 2020, and serves as a member of the House of Lords as a Lord Temporal.

In 2004, she joined the House of Lords as a Lord of Appeal in Ordinary. She is the only woman to have been appointed to that position. She served as a Law Lord until 2009 when she, along with the other Law Lords, transferred to the new Supreme Court as a result of the Constitutional Reform Act 2005. She served as Deputy President of the Supreme Court from 2013 to 2017.

On 5 September 2017, Hale was appointed under the premiership of Theresa May to serve as President of the Supreme Court, and was sworn in on 2 October 2017. She was the third person and first woman to serve in the role. Hale is one of four women to have been appointed to the Supreme Court (alongside Lady Black, Lady Arden and Lady Rose).

Since 30 July 2018, Hale has been a non-permanent judge of the Court of Final Appeal of Hong Kong. In June 2021, she announced her decision not to seek reappointment on the Hong Kong court after the end of her term in July while mentioning the impact of the controversial Hong Kong national security law. She will be the first senior British judge to withdraw from Hong Kong's top court after the enactment of the security law in June 2020.

In 2019, Hale was appointed an Honorary Professor of Law at University College London. Hale has also been Honorary President of the Cambridge University Law Society since 2015.

On 11 January 2020, Lady Hale was succeeded by Lord Reed as President of the Supreme Court.

Early life
Brenda Marjorie Hale was born on 31 January 1945 in Leeds, West Riding of Yorkshire. Both her parents were headteachers. She has two sisters. Hale lived in Redcar until the age of three when she moved with her parents to Richmond, North Yorkshire. She was educated at the Richmond High School for Girls (now part of Richmond School), where she and her two sisters were all head girls. She later studied at Girton College, Cambridge (the first from her school to attend Cambridge), where she read law. Hale was one of six women in her class, which had 110 men, and graduated with a starred first and top of her class in 1966.

After becoming an assistant law lecturer at the Victoria University of Manchester (now the University of Manchester) in 1966 and lecturer in 1968, she was called to the Bar by Gray's Inn in 1969, topping the list in the bar finals for that year.

Working part-time as a barrister, Hale spent 18 years mostly in academia, becoming Reader in 1981 and Professor of Law at Manchester in 1986. Two years earlier, she became the first woman and youngest person to be appointed to the Law Commission, overseeing a number of important reforms in family law during her nine years with the Commission. In 1989, she was appointed Queen's Counsel.

Judicial career
Hale was appointed a recorder (a part-time circuit judge) in 1989, and in 1994 became a judge in the Family Division of the High Court of Justice (styled The Honourable Mrs Justice Hale). Upon her appointment, as is convention, she was appointed a Dame Commander of the Order of the British Empire (DBE). In 1999, Hale followed Dame Elizabeth Butler-Sloss to become only the second woman to be appointed to the Court of Appeal (styled The Right Honourable Lady Justice Hale), entering the Privy Council at the same time.

On 12 January 2004, she was appointed the first female Lord of Appeal in Ordinary and was created a life peer as Baroness Hale of Richmond, of Easby in the County of North Yorkshire.

In June 2013, she was appointed Deputy President of the Supreme Court of the United Kingdom to succeed Lord Hope of Craighead. In July 2017, she was appointed to be the next President of the Supreme Court, succeeding Lord Neuberger of Abbotsbury. She took office in September 2017.

In December 2018, during an interview to mark the centenary of the Sex Disqualification (Removal) Act 1919, Lady Hale argued that the judiciary needed to become more diverse so that the public have greater confidence in judges. Hale called for a more balanced gender representation on the UK's highest court and swifter progress promoting those from minority ethnic backgrounds and with “less privileged lives”. However, Hale objected to the idea of positive discrimination because “no one wants to feel they have got the job in any way other than on their own merits”.

In September 2019, Prime Minister Boris Johnson prorogued Parliament over Brexit. As President of the Supreme Court of the United Kingdom, Lady Hale found that Johnson's prorogation was unlawful, terminating the suspension of Parliament. Hale described the  ruling as "a source of, not pride, but satisfaction." In 2020, reaching the mandatory retirement age, Hale retired from the court.

Hong Kong judgeship 
On 21 March 2018, the Hong Kong judiciary announced her nomination as a non-permanent judge from other common law jurisdictions of the Court of Final Appeal. Her appointment was accompanied by the appointments of Andrew Cheung and Beverley McLachlin. The appointment was gazetted by the Chief Executive of Hong Kong Carrie Lam and took effect 30 July 2018 for a three-year term.

In October 2020, after China imposing a controversial national security law on Hong Kong, Hale expressed her concerns about hearing cases in Hong Kong: "I have never sat and it has not been arranged at least for me to sit . . . when that happened I would have a serious moral question to ask myself."

In June 2021, she revealed her wish of not wanting to be reappointed as a judge in Hong Kong after her three-year term ending in July. As she was making her decision known before a webinar, she also mentioned the impact of the security law and said, ‘The jury is out on how they will be able to operate the new national security law. There are all sorts of question marks up in the air.’ However, the Hong Kong Judiciary claimed that her leaving was for personal reasons.

Hale became the first senior British judge to quit Hong Kong’s top court after her fellow judge, Australian James Spigelman resigned as a Hong Kong judge in November 2020.

Significant lectures
On 27 June 2011, Lady Hale gave a lecture in memory of Sir Henry Hodge, "Equal Access to Justice in the Big Society" in which she explains the benefits of an inquisitorial Tribunal system over adversarial proceedings. 

On 10 September 2015, Hale delivered the Caldwell Public Lecture at the University of Melbourne, Australia, on the topic "Protecting Human Rights in the UK Courts: What are we doing wrong?".

On 2 November 2018, Hale delivered an SLS Centenary Lecture at the University of Essex, United Kingdom, on the topic of "All Human Beings? Reflection on the 70th Anniversary of the Universal Declaration of Human Rights".

On 7 March 2019, Hale delivered the University of Cambridge Freshfields law lecture, which she entitled "Principle and Pragmatism in Developing Private Law".

In a 2019 Girton College lecture entitled "100 Years of Women in Law", Hale described the "Brenda Agenda" (a neologism coined by her Supreme Court colleague Lord Hope) as "quite simply, the belief that women are equal to men and should enjoy the same rights and freedoms that they do; but that women’s lives are necessarily sometimes different from men’s and the experience of leading those lives is just as valid and important in shaping the law as is the experience of men’s lives."

Honours

 She was appointed as a Queen's Counsel (QC) in 1989.
 She was made a Dame Commander of the Order of the British Empire (DBE) in the Civil Division in 1994 upon her appointment as a High Court Justice
 She was sworn in as a Member of Her Majesty's Most Honourable Privy Council in 1999, giving her the honorific title "The Right Honourable" for life.
 On 12 January 2004 She was given a Life Peerage upon being appointed as a Lord of Appeal in Ordinary. She took the title Baroness Hale of Richmond, of Easby in the County of North Yorkshire. She sat in the House of Lords as a Crossbencher. 
 The Law Building at the University of Salford was named after her in 2008.
 She received an Honorary Fellowship from Bristol University in July 2017. An Honorary Fellowship is the highest honour the University can bestow.

 She received the Hibernian Law Medal from the Law Society of Ireland on 12 May 2022 for outstanding contributions to the advancement of justice, integrity of the rule of law, independence of the judiciary and the legal professions, and/or public access to and understanding of the legal system.

Commonwealth honours

Scholastic
 University degrees

 Chancellor, visitor, governor, rector and fellowships

Honorary degrees

Memberships and Fellowships

Personal life
In 1968, Hale married John Hoggett, a fellow law lecturer at Manchester, with whom she had one daughter. The marriage was dissolved in 1992. In the same year, she married Julian Farrand, former dean of the law faculty at Manchester, and subsequently Pensions Ombudsman.

In April 2018, Hale featured as a celebrity judge on BBC cooking show MasterChef.

In September 2021, Hale appeared on BBC Radio 4's Desert Island Discs. In October 2021 she unveiled a blue plaque in honour of Helena Normanton on 22 Mecklenburgh Square in London, saying “Helena Normanton was the pioneer of female barristers. She had to overcome a great deal of prejudice and discrimination. A blue plaque is a fitting tribute to her courage and her example to women barristers everywhere.”

Bibliography
Parents and Children (1977, 2nd ed. 1981, Sweet and Maxwell) 
Women and the Law (as Brenda Hoggett, with Susan Atkins, 1984, republished 2018, Institute of Advanced Legal studies, University of London) 
The Family, Law & Society (with David Pearl, Elizabeth Cooke, Daniel Monk, 2009, Oxford University Press) 
Mental Health Law (2017, with Penelope Gorman, Rachel Barrett and Jessica Jones, Sweet & Maxwell, 
Spider Woman: A Life (2021, as Lady Hale)

Arms

References

External links

Profile from The Guardian, 9 January 2004

1945 births
Living people
Academics of King's College London
Academics of the Victoria University of Manchester
Alumni of Girton College, Cambridge
English King's Counsel
British women lawyers
Chancellors of the University of Bristol
Dames Commander of the Order of the British Empire
Deputy Presidents of the Supreme Court of the United Kingdom
English barristers
English legal scholars
English legal writers
English women judges
Family Division judges
Fellows of Girton College, Cambridge
Justices of the Court of Final Appeal (Hong Kong)
Hong Kong judges
Judges of the Supreme Court of the United Kingdom
Lady Justices of Appeal
Law lords
Life peeresses created by Elizabeth II
Members of Gray's Inn
Members of the Judicial Committee of the Privy Council
Members of the Privy Council of the United Kingdom
Presidents of the Supreme Court of the United Kingdom
20th-century King's Counsel
Writers from Leeds
20th-century women lawyers
20th-century English women
20th-century English people
Honorary Fellows of the British Academy
21st-century women judges